The House of Assembly is the legislature of Dominica. It is established by Chapter III of the Constitution of Dominica, and together with the President of Dominica constitutes Dominica's Parliament. The House is unicameral, and consists of twenty-one Representatives, nine senators, and the Attorney General as an ex officio member. The Speaker of the House becomes the thirty-second member if chosen from outside the membership of the House.

Representatives are directly elected in single-member constituencies using the simple-majority (or first-past-the-post) system for a term of five years. The Representatives in turn decide whether the senators are to be elected by their vote, or appointed. If appointed, five are chosen by the president with the advice of the Prime Minister and four with the advice of the Leader of the Opposition. The current Senators are appointed. 

The Cabinet of Dominica is appointed from members of the House of Assembly. However, no more than three senators may be members of the Cabinet.

History

House of Assembly was established in 1968, and it was preceded by a colonial Legislative council.

Representatives
Since the election held on 6 December 2022, the Dominica Labour Party holds 19 of the 21 directly elected seats, and independent candidates hold two elected seats. The new House of Assembly included a record ten women.

Senators 
The following Senators were appointed for the parliamentary term beginning 10 February 2020:

International affiliation(s) 
ACP–EU Joint Parliamentary Assembly
Canada-CARICOM Parliamentary Friendship Group
Commonwealth Parliamentary Association
ParlAmericas

See also 
 List of legislatures by country
 List of members of the House of Assembly of Dominica
 List of speakers of the House of Assembly of Dominica
 Leader of the Opposition (Dominica)
 History of Dominica

Notes

References 

.
.
.

External links 
 House of Assembly

About 
 Profile of the Parliament of Dominica - Secretariat of the Commonwealth Parliamentary Association (CPA)
 Dominica, Dominic Electoral system
 Profile of Dominca - Inter-Parlmiamentary Union

Other 
 Laws of the Commonwealth of Dominca - Government portal
 Official Gazette
 Government of the Commonwealth of Dominica - official website

1978 establishments in Dominica
Government of Dominica
Politics of Dominica
Dominica
Dominica
Dominica